Vernon Anthony "Touchdown Tony" Baker (February 16, 1945 – August 9, 1998) was an American professoonal football player who was a running back in the National Football League (NFL). He played from 1968 to 1975, and played for the New Orleans Saints, the Philadelphia Eagles, the Los Angeles Rams, and finally, the San Diego Chargers, and had one Pro Bowl appearance, in 1969.

Football career
Baker graduated from Burlington Community High School in 1963, earning a scholarship to Iowa State University the following year, where he would graduate in 1966. He then played semi-pro ball for a season and a half with the Des Moines Warriors of the Professional Football League of America, before being discovered by a talent scout for the New Orleans Saints. He would sign a contract with the Saints, and begin his NFL career the following year, making an appearance in the Pro Bowl in his second season. It was during this rookie season that sports broadcaster Howard Cosell gave him the nickname Touchdown Tony.  He would end his career in 1975, playing with the San Diego Chargers as a backup.

Death
He was buried in Aspen Grove Cemetery in Burlington, next to his mother, with many of his old NFL teammates in attendance. His burial plot was chosen by his family with two trees in the distance appearing as though they were goalpost uprights. A misprint on his headstone has him named Vernon G. Baker, instead of Vernon A. Baker.

References

1945 births
1998 deaths
People from Burlington, Iowa
American football running backs
Iowa State Cyclones football players
New Orleans Saints players
Philadelphia Eagles players
Los Angeles Rams players
San Diego Chargers players
Eastern Conference Pro Bowl players
Road incident deaths in Iowa